Ahmad Nouri Ziadat (born 1950) is the Jordanian Minister of Justice. He was appointed as minister on 7 May 2021. Previously he had served as Minister of State for Legal Affairs since 12 October 2020 in Bisher Al-Khasawneh's Cabinet led by Prime Minister Bisher Al-Khasawneh.

Education 
Ziadat holds a Bachelor of Law (1983) from the University of Jordan, a Master of Laws (1985) from the Harvard University and a Doctor of Law (1989) from the University of London.

References 

Alumni of the University of London
Living people
Place of birth missing (living people)
Government ministers of Jordan
1950 births
21st-century Jordanian politicians

Harvard University alumni
University of Jordan alumni